Aslanbek Sultanovich Khantsev (born November 28, 1960) is a Russian professional football coach and a former player. Currently, he is working with children's teams.

Khantsev managed Russian First Division side PFC Spartak Nalchik from 1998 to 2000.

References

External links
 Career summary by KLISF

1960 births
Living people
Soviet footballers
Russian footballers
PFC Spartak Nalchik players
Russian football managers
PFC Spartak Nalchik managers
Association football midfielders